Country Club is a census-designated place (CDP) in San Joaquin County, California, United States. The population was 9,379 at the 2010 census, down from 9,462 at the 2000 census. It comprises an unincorporated "island" within the City of Stockton.

Geography

Demographics

2010
The 2010 United States Census reported that Country Club had a population of 9,379. The racial makeup of Country Club was 5,744 (61.2%) White, 472 (5.0%) African American, 159 (1.7%) Native American, 628 (6.7%) Asian, 42 (0.4%) Pacific Islander, 1,537 (16.4%) from other races, and 797 (8.5%) from two or more races. Hispanic or Latino of any race were 3,790 persons (40.4%).

The Census reported that 9,364 people (99.8% of the population) lived in households, 15 (0.2%) lived in non-institutionalized group quarters, and 0 (0%) were institutionalized.

There were 3,463 households, out of which 1,222 (35.3%) had children under the age of 18 living in them, 1,498 (43.3%) were opposite-sex married couples living together, 614 (17.7%) had a female householder with no husband present, 243 (7.0%) had a male householder with no wife present.  There were 267 (7.7%) unmarried opposite-sex partnerships, and 38 (1.1%) same-sex married couples or partnerships. 878 households (25.4%) were made up of individuals, and 388 (11.2%) had someone living alone who was 65 years of age or older. The average household size was 2.70.  There were 2,355 families (68.0% of all households); the average family size was 3.22.

The population was spread out, with 2,424 people (25.8%) under the age of 18, 839 people (8.9%) aged 18 to 24, 2,345 people (25.0%) aged 25 to 44, 2,421 people (25.8%) aged 45 to 64, and 1,350 people (14.4%) who were 65 years of age or older.  The median age was 36.9 years. For every 100 females, there were 92.7 males.  For every 100 females age 18 and over, there were 89.0 males.

The homeowner vacancy rate was 2.7%; the rental vacancy rate was 8.5%.  5,715 people (60.9% of the population) lived in owner-occupied housing units and 3,649 people (38.9%) lived in rental housing units.

2000
As of the census of 2000, there were 9,462 people, 3,596 households, and 2,531 families residing in the CDP. The racial makeup of the CDP was 68.35% White, 3.54% African American, 1.43% Native American, 6.12% Asian, 0.14% Pacific Islander, 11.77% from other races, and 8.66% from two or more races. Hispanic or Latino of any race were 28.74% of the population.

There were 3,596 households, out of which 33.3% had children under the age of 18 living with them, 50.4% were married couples living together, 14.1% had a female householder with no husband present, and 29.6% were non-families. 23.3% of all households were made up of individuals, and 11.2% had someone living alone who was 65 years of age or older.  The average household size was 2.62 and the average family size was 3.10.

In the CDP, the population was spread out, with 27.4% under the age of 18, 7.5% from 18 to 24, 28.5% from 25 to 44, 20.3% from 45 to 64, and 16.3% who were 65 years of age or older.  The median age was 36 years. For every 100 females, there were 93.6 males.  For every 100 females age 18 and over, there were 90.1 males.

The median income for a household in the CDP was $40,036, and the median income for a family was $43,114. Males had a median income of $34,583 versus $26,241 for females. The per capita income for the CDP was $18,470.  About 9.5% of families and 11.5% of the population were below the poverty line, including 16.3% of those under age 18 and 7.6% of those age 65 or over.

References

Census-designated places in San Joaquin County, California
Census-designated places in California